Dominique Raheem Mostert (born April 9, 1992) is an American football running back for the Miami Dolphins of the National Football League (NFL). He played college football at Purdue.

Mostert attended New Smyrna Beach High School in New Smyrna Beach, Florida, where he played football and competed in track and field. Mostert led New Smyrna Beach to two playoff berths. After his senior season, he moved on to Purdue University.

In his first collegiate season, Mostert set a school record as he averaged 33.5 yards a return, capped off with a 99-yard touchdown return in the bowl game. He finished the season with seven returns of 39 or more yards, including an 81-yarder at Indiana and a 74-yarder at Wisconsin. Against the Badgers, Mostert racked up 206 yards on five kickoff returns to break 42-year-old school records for total yardage and average yards per return.

High school career
Mostert attended New Smyrna Beach High School, in New Smyrna Beach, Florida, where he was a member of the football and track & field teams. As a football player under coach Lance Jenkins, Mostert returned nine kickoffs and a punt for touchdowns, in addition to having 39 receptions for 723 yards (18.5 average) and four touchdowns as a senior. He also recorded 81 tackles on defense. As a participant in the 2010 Central Florida All-Star Game, Mostert was named MVP after hauling in three passes for nearly 100 yards and returning a kickoff for a 94-yard touchdown. He also made an appearance in the Florida North vs. South football game.

Track and field
As a track athlete under coach Brendan Robinson, Mostert was a standout sprinter, hurdler, and jumper. He won the 2010 FHSAA 3A District 6 title in the 300-meter hurdles. At the 2011 FHSAA 3A Outdoor State Finals, he finished first in the 100 meters, with a time of 10.68 seconds, and placed fourth in the 300-meter hurdles, with a personal-best time of 37.95 seconds.

Mostert was a member of the Purdue track team. He was ranked by NFL.com as the fastest college football player in the NCAA, with only Oklahoma State wide receiver Tyreek Hill possessing a faster 100m time (9.98 s). Mostert took gold in both the 60 meters (6.63s) and 200 meters (20.73s) at the 2014 Big Ten Indoor Track and Field Championships. He qualified for the 2014 NCAA Outdoor Track and Field Championships in the 100 meters (10.15s), 200 meters (20.65s) and as a member of 4x100-meter relay squad.

Recruiting
Mostert committed to Purdue University on January 14, 2011. He chose Purdue over football scholarships from  Indiana University, Marshall University, the University of Illinois, the United States Naval Academy, Rutgers University, the University of Miami, the University of Southern Mississippi, the University of Central Florida, and Wake Forest University.

College career

Mostert attended and played college football at Purdue from 2011 to 2014. In his first collegiate season in 2011, Mostert set a school record as he averaged 33.5 yards a return, capped off with a 99-yard touchdown return in the 2011 Little Caesars Pizza Bowl against Western Michigan. He finished the season with seven returns of 39 or more yards, including an 81-yarder at Indiana and a 74-yarder at Wisconsin. Against the Badgers, Mostert racked up 206 yards on five kickoff returns to break 42-year-old school records for total yardage and average yards per return in a single game. (41.2) For his efforts against Wisconsin, Mostert was named the Big Ten Freshman of the Week, becoming the first Purdue freshman to do it since Rob Henry in October 2010. Mostert’s 837 kickoff return yards are the second best in school history for a single season. He is now ranked 13th on Purdue's career kickoff return yards.

In May 2012, Mostert was named to the preseason Jet Award watch list, an award given to the top return specialist in the NCAA. During spring practice, he was named a captain for the 2012 season. In the 2012 season, Mostert finished with 16 carries for 85 yards and a touchdown to go along with 18 kick returns for 463 yards. In the 2013 season, Mostert finished with 11 carries for 37 yards to go along with 11 kick returns for 258 yards and a touchdown, which was a 100-yarder against Penn State. His role expanded in the 2014 season. Mostert finished with 93 carries for 529 yards and three touchdowns to go along with 34 kick returns for 731 yards.

Collegiate statistics

Professional career

Philadelphia Eagles
After going undrafted during the 2015 NFL Draft, Mostert signed as an undrafted free agent with the Philadelphia Eagles. Mostert had an excellent preseason; between his 157 rushing yards and 191 receiving yards, totaling for 351 yards, Mostert led the NFL in yards from the line of scrimmage in the preseason. He also added in five kick returns for 162 yards. Despite this effort, Mostert was ultimately cut on September 4, 2015, in preparation for the Eagles having to cut their roster down to 53, but he was signed to the Eagles’ practice squad two days later.

Miami Dolphins
On September 14, 2015, the Miami Dolphins signed Mostert off the Eagles practice squad. He returned two kicks for 57 yards for the Dolphins during a Week 2 23-20 road loss to the Jacksonville Jaguars. On October 13, 2015, Mostert was released by the Dolphins in hopes of moving him down to practice squad.

Baltimore Ravens
On October 14, 2015, Mostert was signed by the Baltimore Ravens after losing third-string running back, Lorenzo Taliaferro to a season-ending foot injury. Mostert returned five kicks for 164 yards in seven games with the Ravens. On December 15, 2015, he was cut by the Ravens in hopes of putting him on practice squad; however, Mostert did not clear waivers and was placed on the Browns 53-man roster.

Cleveland Browns 
On December 16, 2015, Mostert was claimed off waivers by the Cleveland Browns. He was named the starting kick returner for the Browns' final three games and returned 12 kicks for 309 yards.

Mostert signed the Browns' one-year tender offer on March 7, 2016. On September 4, 2016, he was waived by the Browns to make room for players claimed off waivers.

New York Jets
On September 6, 2016, Mostert was signed to the New York Jets practice squad, but was released six days later.

Chicago Bears
On September 13, 2016, Mostert was signed to the Bears' practice squad. On September 21, he was elevated to the active roster. Mostert appeared in two games with the Bears in the 2016 season. He was released on October 3, 2016, and re-signed to the practice squad the next day. Mostert was released by the Bears on November 24, 2016.

San Francisco 49ers

2016 season
On November 28, 2016, Mostert was signed to the 49ers' practice squad. He was promoted to the active roster on December 31, 2016. Mostert played in the regular-season finale against the Seattle Seahawks, which the 49ers narrowly lost by a score of 25-23.

Mostert finished the 2016 season with 68 return yards and a six-yard carry.

2017 season
On November 29, 2017, Mostert was placed on injured reserve. He finished the 2017 season with six carries for 30 rushing yards and 83 return yards in 11 games.

2018 season
Mostert played very sparingly in the first five games of the 2018 season. However, his role increased starting in Week 6. Against the Green Bay Packers on Monday Night Football, Mostert had 12 carries for 87 yards in the narrow 33–30 road loss. He added 59 rushing yards in the next game against the Los Angeles Rams, which the 49ers lost 39-10. Two weeks later against the Oakland Raiders on Thursday Night Football, Mostert had seven carries for 86 yards and scored his first NFL touchdown on a 52-yard rush in the third quarter before leaving the eventual 34-3 victory with a fractured forearm. He was placed on injured reserve on November 2, 2018.

Mostert finished the 2018 season with 34 carries for 261 yards and a touchdown to go along with six receptions for 25 yards in nine games and no starts.

2019 season

On March 15, 2019, Mostert signed a three-year contract extension with the 49ers.

During a Week 2 41-17 road victory over the Cincinnati Bengals, Mostert had 13 carries for 83 yards to go along with three receptions for 68 yards and his first receiving touchdown of his career on a 39-yard screen pass from Jimmy Garoppolo. During a Week 8 51-13 victory over the Carolina Panthers, Mostert scored his first rushing touchdown of the season on a 41-yard rush in the fourth quarter. Mostert finished the game with nine carries for 60 yards and the aforementioned touchdown. During a Week 12 37-8 victory against the Green Bay Packers, he had six carries for 45 yards and a touchdown to go along with a 22-yard reception. In the next game against the Baltimore Ravens, Mostert had 19 carries for 146 yards and a 40-yard touchdown to go along with two receptions for eight yards as the 49ers narrowly lost on the road by a score of 20-17. The following week against the New Orleans Saints, Mostert rushed 10 times for 69 yards and a touchdown and caught two passes for 40 yards, including a 35-yard touchdown pass thrown by wide receiver Emmanuel Sanders in the narrow 48-46 road victory. Mostert recorded a rushing touchdown in each of the next two games against the Atlanta Falcons and Los Angeles Rams. In the regular-season finale against the Seattle Seahawks, Mostert had 10 carries for 57 yards and two touchdowns to go along with a 16-yard reception in the 26-21 road victory.

Mostert finished the 2019 season with 137 carries for 772 yards and eight touchdowns along with 14 receptions for 180 yards and two touchdowns in 16 games and no starts.

The 49ers began the postseason with a 27–10 victory over the Minnesota Vikings in the Divisional Round, where Mostert rushed 12 times for 58 yards and recovered a fumble lost by punt returner Marcus Sherels before leaving the game due to a calf injury. Mostert returned from injury in the 37–20 NFC Championship Game victory over the Green Bay Packers with 29 carries for a franchise postseason record of 220 yards and four touchdowns (second in franchise postseason history only to NFL record-holder Ricky Watters, and tied with LeGarrette Blount for second-most in NFL postseason history) to go along with two receptions for six yards. It was the second-most rushing yards in NFL postseason history to Eric Dickerson's 248 in 1986. During Super Bowl LIV against the Kansas City Chiefs, Mostert had 12 carries for 58 yards and a touchdown to go along with a two-yard reception in the 31–20 loss.

2020 season
On July 8, 2020, Mostert requested a trade from the 49ers. He rescinded his request after securing a restructured contract with the 49ers on July 27.

During the season-opening 24-20 loss to the Arizona Cardinals, Mostert had 15 carries for 56 yards to go along with four receptions for 95 yards and a 76-yard touchdown. In the next game against the New York Jets, he led the game off with an 80-yard rushing touchdown. Mostert finished with 92 rushing yards before leaving the eventual 31-13 road victory with an apparent injury after the first two quarters. Mostert was placed on injured reserve on October 24, 2020, with a high ankle sprain. He was activated on November 28, 2020. Mostert was placed back on injured reserve on December 25, 2020.

Mostert finished the 2020 season with 104 carries for 521 yards and two touchdowns to go along with 16 receptions for 156 yards and a touchdown in eight games and starts.

2021 season
During the season-opener against the Detroit Lions, Mostert had two carries for 20 yards before leaving the eventual 41-33 road victory with an apparent knee injury. It was later revealed that he was diagnosed with significant cartilage damage in his knee. Mostert was originally slated to be out for at least eight weeks, but instead, it was later deemed that the injury was serious enough to prematurely end his season.

Miami Dolphins (second stint)
On March 17, 2022, Mostert signed a one-year contract with the Dolphins. In Week 5, against the New York Jets, he had 18 carries for 113 rushing yards and one rushing touchdown in the 40–17 loss.

On March 15, 2023, Mostert signed a two-year, $5.6 million contract extension with the Dolphins.

NFL career statistics

Regular season

Postseason

Personal life
Growing up in New Smyrna Beach, Florida, known as the "shark-bite capital of the world," Mostert often surfed in the Atlantic Ocean. He married Devon Beckwith on March 3, 2017. Their first child, Gunnar Grey, was born in June 2018.

Mostert is an advocate for ocean conservancy and melanoma awareness. During his time with the 49ers, he kept a list of the teams that cut him before he signed with San Francisco and looked at it for motivation before every 49ers game.

References

External links
 
 

 Miami Dolphins bio
 Purdue Boilermakers bio

1992 births
Living people
People from New Smyrna Beach, Florida
African-American players of American football
American football running backs
Purdue Boilermakers football players
Philadelphia Eagles players
Miami Dolphins players
Baltimore Ravens players
Cleveland Browns players
New York Jets players
Chicago Bears players
San Francisco 49ers players
Sportspeople from Volusia County, Florida
Players of American football from Florida
21st-century African-American sportspeople